Lyudmila Karpawna Shleh (born 21 September 1948) is a Belarusian composer. She was born in Baranovichi and studied with Mikalay Il'ich Aladaw and Dmitry Smolsky at the Conservatory of Belarus, graduating in 1972. She joined the Belarusian Composers’ Union in 1974 and continued her education with Sergey Slonimsky while teaching at the Leningrad Conservatory. After completing her studies in 1980, she has worked as a full-time composer.

Works
Karpawna's compositions are influenced by the folk music of Belarus and by liturgical music. Selected works include:

Tarakanischche (The Cockroach) (after K. Chukovsky), 1972
Lubok, choral suite, 1974
Trava-murava, cantata, 1979
Requiem ‘Pamyatayse’ (Remember) choral (after A. Adamovich)
Kolesnik: Ya z vognennay vyoski (I am from the Fiery Village), speaker, chorus, solo vv, orchestra, 1982
Igrïshchï (Games), vocal-symphony picture, 2 solo vv, chorus, orchestra, 1983
Skarbonka minulaga (Sadness for the Past) (cantata, T. Bondar), 1987
Blagoslovi, dusha moya (Praise the Lord, my Soul), 1991
Skaz pra Igara (A Tale about Igor) (oratorio, Ya. Kupala: Slovu o polku Igoreve), speaker, organ, chorus, organ, 1991
12 pesnopeniy o belorusskikh svyatïkh (12 Chants about Belarusian Saints), 1994
Nestserka, symphonic poem, 1971
Yarmarochnïye zarisovki (Fairground Sketches), orchestral suite, 1979
Yuraw dzen (Yury’s Day), fairy-concerto for orchestra

References

1948 births
Living people
20th-century classical composers
Music educators
Women classical composers
Belarusian composers
Women music educators
20th-century women composers